Kern Medical is a 222-bed teaching hospital located in Bakersfield, California in central California's San Joaquin Valley. The hospital was founded in 1867.

Notable staff 
Selma Calmes, co-founder of the Anesthesia History Association, former chair of the department of anesthesiology.
Hans Einstein

References

Hospitals in Kern County, California
Teaching hospitals in California
Buildings and structures in Bakersfield, California